Jo Frost: Extreme Parental Guidance is a British reality television programme that aired on Channel 4 from 9 February 2010 to 5 August 2012. It serves as a follow-up programme to Supernanny that ran from 7 July 2004 to 8 October 2008.

Episodes

Series 1

Series 2

References

External links
 

2010 British television series debuts
2012 British television series endings
British reality television series
Channel 4 original programming
English-language television shows
Parenting television series
Works about child care occupations